Bostandere can refer to:

 Bostandere, Çan
 Bostandere, Mustafakemalpaşa
 Bostandere, Refahiye